The  Monaco Cocktails Gateway Classic 125 was a combination race between NASCAR K&N Pro Series East and NASCAR K&N Pro Series West at the World Wide Technology Raceway.

Past winners

Notes 
2019: Race shortened to 98 laps due to time constraints.

References

External links 
 Racing-Reference.info – World Wide Technology Raceway at Gateway

2018 establishments in Illinois
ARCA Menards Series East
ARCA Menards Series West
Motorsport in Illinois
Recurring sporting events established in 2018
Recurring sporting events disestablished in 2019
NASCAR races at Gateway Motorsports Park